Beth A. Plale is Michael A. and Laurie Burns McRobbie Bicentennial Professor of Computer Engineering at Indiana University. She is known for her work on open science, trust in artificial intelligence, and the policy implications of data science.

Education and career 
Plale has a B.Sc. in computer science from the University of Southern Mississippi (1984). She then received an M.B.A. from University of La Verne (1986) and an M.S. from Temple University (1992). In 1998 she earned her Ph.D. from State University of New York Binghamton. Following her Ph.D. she was a postdoctoral fellow at Georgia Institute of Technology. In 2001, she moved to Indiana University as a tenure track professor. In 2009 she became director of the Data To Insight Center and Executive Director of the Pervasive Technology Institute in 2021.

In 2013, Plale was one of the founding scientists of the Research Data Alliance, a group working to improve open access to data. From 2017 until 2021, Plale was a science advisor at the National Science Foundation.

Selected publications

Awards and honors 
In 2004, Plale received an early career award from the United States Department of Energy. In 2006, Plale was named a senior member of the Association for Computing Machinery. Plale was a keynote speaker at the 2020 PIDapalooza meeting.

References

External links 

 

Indiana University faculty
University of Southern Mississippi alumni
University of La Verne people
Temple University alumni
Binghamton University people
Living people
21st-century women
Year of birth missing (living people)